William Bendix (January 14, 1906 – December 14, 1964) was an American film, radio, and television actor, who typically played rough, blue-collar characters. He is best remembered for his role in Wake Island, which earned him an Academy Award nomination for Best Supporting Actor. He also portrayed the clumsily earnest aircraft plant worker Chester A. Riley in both the radio and television versions of The Life of Riley, and baseball player Babe Ruth in The Babe Ruth Story. Bendix was a frequent co-star of Alan Ladd, the two appearing in ten films together; both actors coincidentally died in 1964.

Early life
Bendix was born in Manhattan, the only child of Oscar and Hilda (Carnell) Bendix, and was named William after his German paternal grandfather. His uncle was composer, conductor, and violinist Max Bendix. In the early 1920s, Bendix was a batboy for the New York Yankees and said he saw Babe Ruth hit more than 100 home runs at Yankee Stadium. However, he was fired after fulfilling Ruth's request for a large order of hot dogs and soda before a game, which resulted in Ruth being unable to play that day. He worked as a grocer until the Great Depression.

Career

Film

Bendix began his acting career at age 30 in the New Jersey Federal Theatre Project. He made his film debut in 1942. He played in supporting roles in dozens of Hollywood films, usually as a warm-hearted gangster, detective or serviceman. He began with appearances in films noir, including a supporting role in The Glass Key (1942), which featured Brian Donlevy, Alan Ladd and Veronica Lake in the leads. He soon gained attention after appearing in Alfred Hitchcock's Lifeboat (1944) as Gus, a wounded and dying American sailor. He was the top-billed lead in The Hairy Ape (1944) based upon the Eugene O'Neill play, also starring Susan Hayward and Dorothy Comingore.

Bendix's other film roles include his portrayal of Babe Ruth in The Babe Ruth Story (1948) – a film roundly considered one of the worst sports biopics in film history and Sir Sagramore opposite Bing Crosby in A Connecticut Yankee in King Arthur's Court (1949), in which he took part in the trio, "Busy Doing Nothing". He played Nick the bartender in the film version of William Saroyan's The Time of Your Life (1948) starring James Cagney. Bendix had appeared in the stage version, but in the role of Officer Krupp (a role played on film by Broderick Crawford). He was cast in The Blue Dahlia (1946), appearing for the second time alongside Ladd and Lake. He also starred in a film adaptation of his radio program The Life of Riley (1949).

Radio and television
Bendix's appearance in the Hal Roach-produced film The McGuerins from Brooklyn (1942), playing a rugged blue-collar man, led to his best-remembered role. Producer and creator Irving Brecher saw Bendix as the perfect personification of Chester A. Riley, giving a second chance to a show whose audition failed when the sponsor spurned Groucho Marx for the lead. With Bendix stumbling, bumbling, and skating almost perpetually on thin ice, stretching the patience of his otherwise loving wife and children, The Life of Riley was a radio hit from 1944 through 1951, and Bendix brought an adaptation of the film version to Lux Radio Theatre.

The show began as a proposed Groucho Marx radio series, The Flotsam Family, but the sponsor balked at what would have been essentially a straight head-of-household role for the comedian. Then creator and producer Irving Brecher saw Bendix as taxicab company owner Tim McGuerin in The McGuerins from Brooklyn. Brecher stated, "He was a Brooklyn guy and there was something about him. I thought, This guy could play it. He'd made a few films, like Lifeboat, but he was not a name. So I took The Flotsam Family script, revised it, made it a Brooklyn Family, took out the flippancies and made it more meat-and-potatoes, and thought of a new title, The Life of Riley. Bendix's delivery and the spin he put on his lines made it work." The reworked script cast Bendix as blundering Chester A. Riley, a wing riveter at the fictional Cunningham Aircraft plant in California. His frequent exclamation of indignation"What a revoltin' development this is!"became one of the catchphrases of the 1940s. It was later reused by Benjamin J. Grimm of the Fantastic Four.

Bendix was not able to play the role on television because of a contracted film commitment. The part instead went to Jackie Gleason and aired a single season beginning in October 1949. Despite winning an Emmy award, the show was cancelled, in part because Gleason was less acceptable as Riley, since Bendix had been so identified with the part on radio. In 1953, Bendix became available for a new television version, and this time the show was a hit. The second television version of The Life of Riley ran from 1953 to 1958, long enough for Riley to become a grandfather.

On the 1952 television program This Is Your Life, hosted by Ralph Edwards, Bendix was claimed to be a descendant of the 19th-century composer Felix Mendelssohn.

Bendix played the lead in Rod Serling's "The Time Element" (1958), a time-travel adventure episode about a man who travels back to 1941 and unsuccessfully tries to warn everyone in Honolulu about the impending attack on Pearl Harbor; the program's success opened the doors for Serling's later series The Twilight Zone. Bendix also appeared on The Ford Show, Starring Tennessee Ernie Ford (also 1958). He returned for a second appearance on October 1, 1959, the fourth-season premiere of the series, in which he and Tennessee Ernie performed a comedy skit about a safari.

In NBC's Wagon Train ("Around the Horn", 1958), Bendix played the captain of a sailing cargo ship who shanghaied Major Adams (Ward Bond), Bill Hawks (Terry Wilson) and Charlie Wooster (Frank McGrath), forcing them to work on his ship. On November 16, 1959, Bendix appeared on NBC's color broadcast of The Steve Allen Plymouth Show with Jack Kerouac. A color videotape of the broadcast survives. Bendix starred in all 17 episodes of the NBC western series Overland Trail (1960) in the role of Frederick Thomas "Fred" Kelly, the crusty superintendent of the Overland Stage Company. Doug McClure, later Trampas on The Virginian, co-starred as his young understudy, Frank "Flip" Flippen. He guest-starred in an episode of Mister Ed ("Pine Lake Lodge", 1961) which served as a back door pilot for a proposed sitcom that was not picked up.

In the fall of 1964, an American situation comedy starring Bendix and Martha Raye was scheduled to air on CBS, but due to Bendix's shaky health, the network decided not to air the program. This action resulted in a lawsuit from Bendix for $2.658 million in May, with the actor stating that the decision hurt his career and that he was in excellent health and could perform all of the requirements of the agreement. The case was settled out of court. Bendix died on December 14, 1964, of complications from pneumonia.

Reflections
Bendix saw advantages to both film and stage work. "“Films take tremendous pressure offyou can always reshoot a scene. But on the stage you can work with a part, build it from performance to performance.”

As a professional, he was pragmatic and unsentimental about his career. His credo, he remarked, was, “Save a buck or two and keep on actingthat's me.” In an interview in 1960 he summed up his life: “I've had a long, – varied, pleasant, eventful career. I don't hate anybody and I don't have any bitter thoughts. I started out without any advantages, but I've been lucky and successful and I've had fun.”

Personal life
Bendix married a childhood friend, Theresa Stefanotti, on October 22, 1927. They remained married until his death 37 years later in 1964. The couple had a daughter, Lorraine, and adopted another, Stephanie. 

Bendix died in Los Angeles at age 58 in 1964 as the result of a chronic stomach ailment that brought on malnutrition and ultimately lobar pneumonia. He was interred at the San Fernando Mission Cemetery in Mission Hills, Los Angeles.

Bendix was a Republican. During the 1944 presidential election campaign, he attended a large rally organized by David O. Selznick in the Los Angeles Coliseum in support of the Dewey-Bricker ticket as well as Governor Earl Warren of California.

Complete filmography

Partial television credits
 The Life of Riley (1953–1958)
 Westinghouse Desilu Playhouse: "The Time Element" (TV series, 1958) as Peter Jenson
 The Untouchables: "The Tri-State Gang" (TV series, 1959) as Wally Legenza
 Overland Trail, a 1960 Western series starring Bendix and Doug McClure

Dramatic radio appearances
 Cavalcade of America (1952) -- Portraying Lou Diamond in "The Marine Who Was 200 Years OldReferences

 Smithsonian Collection: Old Time Radio All-Time Favourites, liner notes from audio cassette box set. Joe Bevilaqua. Radio Spirits: Schiller Park, 1994.
 John Dunning, On the Air: The Encyclopedia of Old-Time Radio'' (New York: Oxford University Press, 1998.)

External links

 
 
 
 
 

1906 births
1964 deaths
American male film actors
American male stage actors
American male radio actors
American male television actors
Male actors from New York City
People from Manhattan
Deaths from pneumonia in California
Burials at San Fernando Mission Cemetery
20th-century American male actors
California Republicans
Western (genre) television actors
Federal Theatre Project people